In quantum field theory, gauge gravitation theory is the effort to extend Yang–Mills theory, which provides a universal description of the fundamental interactions, to describe gravity.

Gauge gravitation theory should not be confused with the similarly-named gauge theory gravity, which is a formulation of (classical) gravitation in the language of geometric algebra. Nor should it be confused with Kaluza–Klein theory, where the gauge fields are used to describe particle fields, but not gravity itself.

Overview
The first gauge model of gravity was suggested by Ryoyu Utiyama (1916–1990) in 1956 just two years after birth of the gauge theory itself. However, the initial attempts to construct the gauge theory of gravity by analogy with the gauge models of internal symmetries encountered a problem of treating general covariant transformations and establishing the gauge status of a pseudo-Riemannian metric (a tetrad field).

In order to overcome this drawback, representing tetrad fields as gauge fields of the translation group was attempted. Infinitesimal generators of general covariant transformations were considered as those of the translation gauge group, and a tetrad (coframe) field was identified with the translation part of an affine connection on a world manifold . Any such connection is a sum  of a linear world connection  and a soldering form  where  is a non-holonomic frame. There are different physical interpretations of the translation part  of affine connections. In gauge theory of dislocations, a field  describes a distortion. At the same time, given a linear frame , the decomposition  motivates many authors to treat a coframe  as a translation gauge field.

Difficulties of constructing gauge gravitation theory by analogy with the Yang–Mills one result from the gauge transformations in these theories belonging to different classes. In the case of internal symmetries, the gauge transformations are just vertical automorphisms of a principal bundle  leaving its base  fixed. These automorphisms are called general covariant transformations. General covariant transformations are sufficient in order to restate Einstein's general relativity and metric-affine gravitation theory as the gauge ones.

In terms of gauge theory on natural bundles, gauge fields are linear connections on a world manifold , defined as principal connections on the linear frame bundle , and a metric (tetrad) gravitational field plays the role of a Higgs field responsible for spontaneous symmetry breaking of general covariant transformations.

Spontaneous symmetry breaking is a quantum effect when the vacuum is not invariant under the transformation group. These sections are treated as classical Higgs fields.

The idea of the pseudo-Riemannian metric as a Higgs field appeared while constructing non-linear (induced) representations of the general linear group , of which the Lorentz group is a Cartan subgroup. The geometric equivalence principle postulating the existence of a reference frame in which Lorentz invariants are defined on the whole world manifold is the theoretical justification for the reduction of the structure group  of the linear frame bundle  to the Lorentz group. Then the very definition of a pseudo-Riemannian metric on a manifold  as a global section of the quotient bundle  leads to its physical interpretation as a Higgs field. The physical reason for world symmetry breaking is the existence of Dirac fermion matter, whose symmetry group is the universal two-sheeted covering  of the restricted Lorentz group, .

See also

References

Bibliography 
 

 

 

Gauge theories
Theories of gravity